Mexico Farms Airport  is a public airport located  south of downtown Cumberland, Maryland, United States. The airport is located immediately south of the larger Greater Cumberland Regional Airport.

Transportation in Cumberland, MD-WV-PA
Airports in Maryland
Transportation buildings and structures in Allegany County, Maryland